In economics, an aggregate is a summary measure. It replaces a vector that is composed of many real numbers by a single real number, or a scalar. Consequently, there occur various problems that are inherent in the formulations that use aggregated variables.

The aggregation problem is the difficult problem of finding a valid way to treat an empirical or theoretical aggregate as if it reacted like a less-aggregated measure, say, about behavior of an individual agent as described in general microeconomic theory (see Representative agent, Heterogeneity in economics).

The second meaning of "aggregation problem" is the theoretical difficulty in using and treating laws and theorems that include aggregate variables. A typical example is the aggregate production function. Another famous problem is Sonnenschein-Mantel-Debreu theorem. Most of macroeconomic statements comprise this problem.

Examples of aggregates in micro- and macroeconomics relative to less aggregated counterparts are:
 Food vs. apples
 Price level and real GDP vs. the price and quantity of apples
 Capital stock vs. the value of computers of a certain type and the value of steam shovels
 Money supply vs. paper currency
 General unemployment rate vs. the unemployment rate of civil engineers
Standard theory uses simple assumptions to derive general, and commonly accepted, results such as the law of demand to explain market behavior. An example is the abstraction of a composite good. It considers the price of one good changing proportionately to the composite good, that is, all other goods. If this assumption is violated and the agents are subject to aggregated utility functions, restrictions on the latter are necessary to yield the law of demand. The aggregation problem emphasizes:
 How broad such restrictions are in microeconomics
 Use of broad factor inputs ("labor" and "capital"), real "output", and "investment", as if there was only a single such aggregate is without a solid foundation for rigorously deriving analytical results.
Franklin Fisher notes that this has not dissuaded macroeconomists from continuing to use such concepts.

Aggregate consumer demand curve 
The aggregate consumer demand curve is the summation of the individual consumer demand curves. The aggregation process preserves only two characteristics of individual consumer preference theory—continuity and homogeneity. Aggregation introduces three additional non-price determinants of demand:
 Number of consumers
 Distribution of tastes among the consumers
 Distribution of incomes among consumers of different taste
Thus if the population of consumers increases, ceteris paribus the demand curve will shift out; if the proportion of consumers with a strong preference for a good increases, ceteris paribus the demand for that good will change. Finally, if the distribution of income changes in favor of consumers who prefer the good in question, the demand will shift out. It is important to remember that factors that affect individual demand can also affect aggregate demand. However, net effects must be considered. The most important problem for micro- and macro-economics is the Sonnenschein–Mantel–Debreu theorem, which shows that almost no properties of the individual preference are inherited to the aggregate demand functions.

Difficulties with aggregation

Sonnenschein-Mantel-Debreu theorem 
Sonnenschein-Mantel-Debreu theorem (SMD theorem) is a theorem for exchange economy that can be expressed in the following way:
for a function that is continuous, homogeneous of degree zero, and in accord with Walras's law,there is an economy with at least as many agents as goods such that, for prices bounded away from zero, the function is the aggregate demand
function for this economy.

Independence assumption 

First, to sum the demand functions without other strong assumptions it must be assumed that they are independent – that is, that one consumer's demand decisions are not influenced by the decisions of another consumer. For example, A is asked how many pairs of shoes he would buy at a certain price. A says at that price I would be willing and able to buy two pairs of shoes. B is asked the same question and says four pairs. Questioner goes back to A and says B is willing to buy four pairs of shoes, what do you think about that? A says if B has any interest in those shoes then I have none. Or A, not to be outdone by B, says "then I'll buy five pairs". And on and on. This problem can be eliminated by assuming that the consumers' tastes are fixed in the short run. This assumption can be expressed as assuming that each consumer is an independent idiosyncratic decision maker.

No interesting properties 
This second problem is more serious. As David M. Kreps notes, “total demand will shift about as a function of how individual incomes are distributed even holding total (societal) income fixed. So it makes no sense to speak of aggregate demand as a function of price and societal income". Since any change in relative price brings about a redistribution of real income, there is a separate demand curve for every relative price. Kreps continues, "So what can we say about aggregate demand based on the hypothesis that individuals are preference/utility maximizers? Unless we are able to make strong assumptions about the distribution of preferences or income throughout the economy (everyone has the same homothetic preferences for example) there is little we can say”. The strong assumptions are that everyone has the same tastes and that each person's tastes remain the same as income changes so additional income is spent in exactly the same way as before.

Microeconomist Hal Varian reached a more muted conclusion: "The aggregate demand function will in general possess no interesting properties". However, Varian continued: "the neoclassical theory of the consumer places no restriction on aggregate behavior in general". This means the preference conditions (with the possible exception of continuity) simply do not apply to the aggregate function.

See also 

 Aggregate demand
 Aggregate supply
 Aggregate production function
 Cambridge capital controversy
 Ecological fallacy
 Price index
 Representative agent
 Methodological individualism
 Social choice theory

Notes

References 
 Franklin M. Fisher (1987).  "aggregation problem," The New Palgrave: A Dictionary of Economics, v. 1, pp. 53–55.
 Jesus Felipe and  Franklin M. Fisher (2008).  "aggregation (production)," The New Palgrave Dictionary of Economics, 2nd Edition. Abstract.
 John R. Hicks (1939, 2nd ed. 1946). Value and Capital.
 Werner Hildenbrand (2008). "aggregation (theory),"   The New Palgrave Dictionary of Economics, 2nd Edition.  Abstract.
 Thomas M. Stoker (2008).  "aggregation (econometrics)," The New Palgrave Dictionary of Economics, 2nd Edition.  Abstract.
 Douglas W. Blackburn and Andrey D. Ukhov (2008) "Individual vs. Aggregate Preferences: The Case of a Small Fish in a Big Pond," Abstract.

Macroeconomic aggregates
Microeconomics